The Syrian passport is a travel document issued by Syria's Department of Immigration and Passports to Syrian citizens for international travel. Syrian passports are normally valid for six years; however, for men about to perform military service, they are valid for two years, and they have to get permission from the conscription department for a renewal for another two years.

History

Biometric passport
In late 2016, Syria's Department of Immigration and Passports announced that it is planning to change to biometric passports. In early 2019, Syria announced that it is getting ready to release its new passport.

Appearance

The passport has a navy blue cover with the Syrian coat of arms. The information on the cover page and the inside is written in three languages: Arabic, English and French. Each page has a unique watermark depicting a famous Syrian monument, castle, or ancient building, these include the Krak des Chevaliers, a Crusader castle in Syria and one of the most important preserved medieval castles in the world, Umayyad Mosque and others.

Passport application and fee
Passport applications must be completed in person and the fee to obtain a new passport is :

50000 SYP for a 21 days wait.(apx USD$13)

75000 SYP for a 3 days wait.(apx USD$19)

100000 SYP one day wait.(apx USD$40.2, CAD$56.6 )

Types of passport
There are four different types of Syrian passports: service passport (green cover), diplomatic passport (red cover), special passport (light brown cover), and regular passport (dark blue cover). The passport is 48 pages and is in ICAO format. It's 88mm in width and 125mm in height (5 inches by 3.5 inches).

Identification page
 Photo of the passport holder
 Type ("P" for passport)
 Country Code
 Passport serial number
 Given name and surname of the passport holder
 Father name and mother name
 Date of birth (DD/MM/YYYY)
 Place of birth
 Sex

Visa requirements

As of 7 January 2020, Syrian citizens had visa-free or visa on arrival access to 29 countries and territories, ranking the Syrian passport 105th in the world according to the according to the Henley Passport Index. As of January 2023, Syrian citizens can enter 30 countries visa-free. 33 more countries are available for entry with a visa on arrival.

Refugees
In April 2015, Syria changed its passport requirements so that Syrians outside Syria, including refugees who have fled the Syrian Civil War, are eligible for passports without an intelligence service review. Passports will be issued to Syrians "even if they left in an illegal manner, or they hold non-official passports or travel documents", referring to passports issued by Syrian opposition representatives in Qatar. At the same time, fees required for passports were doubled to $800 for a new passport and $300 for a renewal.

During the European migrant crisis, fake Syrian passports were found being used by non-Syrians to apply for asylum in Europe.

See also
Visa requirements for Syrian citizens
Syrian nationality law

References

Passports by country
Government of Syria